František Häckel was a Czechoslovakian cross-country skier in the 1920s. He won a silver medal at the 1925 FIS Nordic World Ski Championships in the 50 km event.

External links

Czechoslovak male cross-country skiers
Czech male cross-country skiers
Year of birth missing
Year of death missing
FIS Nordic World Ski Championships medalists in cross-country skiing
20th-century Czech people